In mathematics, the  Denjoy–Luzin–Saks theorem  states that a function of generalized bounded variation in the restricted sense has a derivative almost everywhere, and gives further conditions of the set of values of the function where the derivative does not exist. 
N. N. Luzin and A. Denjoy proved a weaker form of the theorem, and  later strengthened their theorem.

References

Theorems in analysis